Saga® cheese originated in Denmark and is a mix of blue cheese and brie. It is a creamy, blue-veined cheese with a white-mould rind. Saga® is a very mild blue-veined cheese. It comes with a delicate blue mold, that may not appear in other varieties of blue cheeses. It is aged for more than 60 days. Saga® Blue cheese pairs nicely with white Riesling wines or hearty red wines.

The Saga® family of cheeses, includes Blue, Blue Brie, Camembert, Creamy Brie, and Gorgonzola. Saga® cheese is also largely produced and sold in America. Arla Foods is one of the largest Saga® cheese producers in Denmark.

Ingredients
Milk
Sodium Chloride
Cheese culture
Rennet

See also
 Blue cheese
 Danish cuisine

References

External links
brie apple grilled cheese sandwich recipe

Danish cheeses
Blue cheeses